Anne Charlotte Clark (born 14 May 1960) is an English poet, singer and songwriter.  Her first album, The Sitting Room, was released in 1982, and she has released over a dozen albums since then.

Her poetry work with experimental musicians occupies a region bounded roughly by electronic, dance (techno applies on occasion) and possibly avant-garde genres, with varying hard as well as romantic and orchestral styles.

Clark is mainly a spoken word artist. Many of her lyrics deal critically with the imperfections of humanity, everyday life, and politics. Especially in her early works she has created a gloomy, melancholy kind of atmosphere bordering on weltschmerz. She has been considered one of the pioneers in the spoken-word music genre, as well as being highly idolised across the board of techno-pop and new wave music, especially across Europe.

Early life 

Clark was born the daughter of a Roman Catholic Irish mother, Cecilia, and a mixed Scottish and Welsh Protestant father, Herbert. She has one brother, John and mentions in her spoken biography 'Notes Taken Traces Left' that her mother also had another son who died shortly after being born. From this biography there are also mentions of her two nephews. Clark recollects her childhood in her spoken biography as being "troubled but loving at the same time". At the age of 16, she left school. She took various jobs, one of which was as a nurse in a psychiatric hospital. Clark then got a job at the local record store (and label), Bonaparte Records. Punk rock was finding its way into London's music scene and perfectly matched her emotions.

Clark soon became involved with the Warehouse Theatre, an independently financed stage for bands, that was always low on cash. Although the theatre's owners initially objected to the strange, pierced punk scene characters and their leather outfits, she was able to successfully arrange the program. Clark managed to fill the theatre with artists like Paul Weller, Linton Kwesi Johnson, French & Saunders, The Durutti Column, Ben Watt (who later became a member of Everything But The Girl), and many others.  She experimented with music and lyrics herself and first appeared on stage in Richard Strange's Cabaret Futura with Depeche Mode. Clark worked with Paul Weller to help set up Riot Stories. He had put up an article about helping young writers that had no chances of being signed up to major records. Clark said that at first the relationship was troubled due to him not replying to her letters. She announced "After a pretty heated letter calling out his rudeness, I received one back in the same tone." Clark subsequently goes on to talk about how the relationship ended up being a strong one, which still exists today.

Career 
In 1982, Clark published her first album, The Sitting Room, with songs written by herself, the album placed in 11th place on  The Top 100 Albums of 1983. On the following albums, Changing Places (1983), Joined up Writing (1984) and Hopeless Cases (1987), Clark benefited from an acquaintance from the Warehouse: keyboardist David Harrow contributed all the music as the co-author and producer. The music created by Harrow that Clark read poetry to, such as "Sleeper in Metropolis," "Our Darkness," and "Wallies," have since been considered milestones of the 1980s and 1990s. David Harrow's music of "Our Darkness" is sampled in Benny Benassi's 2003 hit "Love is Gonna Save Us." The song was also the main feature in the 2016/17 Women's Versace catwalk. Our Darkness has been considered as one of the 20 best industrial records of all time. Factmag describe it as "An influential proto-house record". Clark mentions in her autobiography Notes Taken Traces Left that she has no vivid memory of the creative phase of Our Darkness however, clearly remembers the exact time and place of writing the words to her other club anthem hit Sleeper in Metropolis. Clark was set to start touring in the United States of America in the late 80's however, was subsequently in disagreements with Richard Branson which led her breakthrough in America to be cancelled. Nevertheless, Clark has become a very famous and well respected artist across Europe, especially in Germany where she has a cult following.

In 1985, Clark released the album Pressure Points. It was created in collaboration with John Foxx, who wrote the music and plays on the first five tracks.. The album features the song Heaven which was considered a moderately successful hit across Europe. The song was even meant to be a hit globally, but instead the promotion schedule for the single and subsequently, the album, lead for it to not be as successful as it could.

In 1987, Clark went to Norway for three years, where she worked with Tov Ramstad and Ida Baalsrud, among others.  In co-operation with Charlie Morgan, she released the album Unstill Life in 1991 on SPV Records. Tracks included The Moment, Unstill Life, Abuse and Empty Me. This album was also released in the USA on Radikal Records. During 1992, she released a non-album collaboration on maxi-CD (SPV) with Ida Baalsrud, who both played the violin part and co-wrote If I Could; furthermore, there was also a remix of Our Darkness included on the last track of the CD. At the very end of 1992, in December, Charlie Morgan unexpectedly died of cancer at the age of only 36, which caused many planned collaboration projects to be abandoned.

After several months of reorientation, Clark eventually released The Law is an Anagram of Wealth in 1993, once again in collaboration with Tov Ramstad; the other musicians involved were Paul Downing, Martyn Bates (of the band Eyeless in Gaza), and Andy Bell (not of Erasure fame but talented musician and programmer) and completed a major European Tour.

Just one year later, in 1994, Clark ventured into a style that she had not experimented with before: acoustic music. This eventually culminated in the release of Psychometry (1994), which featured a concert recorded live on stage in the Passionskirche in Berlin-Kreuzberg.

Clark continuously followed her musical roots and the influences of folk and classical music. Her 1998 album, Just After Sunset, a collaboration with Martyn Bates, featured poems by German poet Rainer Maria Rilke translated into English. This album was re-released four years later in 2002 when Clark regained the rights to the album.  The re-release included some additional video footage, although it was of rather poor quality.

In 2003, another album joined Clark's series of acoustic albums: From The Heart – Live In Bratislava, which she recorded together with Murat Parlak (vocals/piano), Jann Michael Engel (cello), Niko Lai (drums and percussion) and Jeff Aug (guitars) in Bratislava, Slovak Republic.

In 2005, Clark joined up with the Belgian act Implant for the album Self-inflicted, on which she delivered guest vocals. The album was released via Alfa Matrix Records, which in the meantime had become her home label outside of Germany. She also appeared on the Implant EP Too Many Puppies.

2006 saw Clark back again in the recording studio with Implant for the EP Fade Away, on which she delivered guest vocals and performed a duet with Leæther Strip's Claus Larsen.  And she also appeared on the album Audioblender by Implant, again released via the Alfa Matrix record label.

In 2008 Clark was in Germany to record her next album The Smallest Act of Kindness, which was released in September 2008. This album was dedicated to her late mother Cecilia Ann Picton-Clark (nee. Murray). At the end of 2010, Clark released the first chapter of an ongoing project Past & Future Tense, the first release on her own label, After Hours Productions.

In January 2011 Clark contributed an arrangement of the Charles Baudelaire poem Enivrez-Vous (Be Drunk) to the audio book and radio play Die künstlichen Paradiese ("The artificial paradises"), (Hörbuch Hamburg/Radio Bremen).

In 2016, Clark announced she would take a year sabbatical, then in January 2017 collaborated on the song Donald Trump Praesidend (Quack Quack) with artist Ludwig.London, intended as a parody in light of the election of Donald Trump. In July 2017, Clark headlined the W Festival in Belgium alongside acts such as Peter Hook and others.

Band 

Current live band members:
 Anne Clark, Vocals
 Jeff Aug, Guitarist
 Tobias Haas, Drums & Percussion
 Murat Parlak, Piano
 Jann Michael Engel, Cello
 Steve Schroyder, Keyboards & Programming

Discography

Albums 
 1982 – The Sitting Room (UK: Red Flame, Germany: Virgin Schallplatten, later: Virgin/EMI; LP)
 1983 – Changing Places (UK: Red Flame, Germany: Virgin Schallplatten, later: Virgin/EMI; LP)
 1984 – Joined Up Writing (UK: Ink Records, later: Virgin/EMI; EP)
 1985 – Pressure Points (UK: Ten, Germany: Virgin Schallplatten; later: Virgin/EMI; LP)
 1987 – Hopeless Cases (UK: Ten; Germany: Virgin Schallplatten, later: Virgin/EMI; LP)
 1988 – R.S.V.P. (UK: Ten; Germany: Virgin Schallplatten, later: Virgin/EMI; LP – recorded live at the Music Centrum, Utrecht, Holland, 1987)
 1991 – Unstill Life (SPV, later: Virgin/EMI; LP/CD)
 1993 – The Law Is an Anagram of Wealth (Germany: SPV; CD)
 1994 – Anne Clark and friends: Psychometry (SPV, later: Virgin/EMI; CD – Live at the Passionskirche Berlin)
 1995 – To Love and Be Loved (SPV, later: Warner Chappell; CD)
 1997 – Wordprocessing: The Remix Project (Columbia Europe/Sony BMG, later: Warner Chappell; CD)
 1998 – Anne Clark & Martyn Bates: Just After Sunset – The Poetry of Rainer Maria Rilke (Labor/Indigo, later: Warner Chappell, re-release 2002: netMusicZone; CD)
 2003 – From the Heart – Live in Bratislava (netMusicZone – Recorded at the studios of Slovak National Radio Broadcast during the European acoustic tour on 17 November 2002)
 2004 – Notes Taken, Traces Left (netMusicZone – Audiobook, song lyrics and commentary from Anne Clark's book)
 2008 – The Smallest Acts of Kindness (netMusicZone)
 2019 – Homage (The Silence Inside) (with Thomas Rückoldt)
2021 – Synaesthesia: Classics Reworked
2022 - Borderland - Found Music for a Lost World (with Ulla Van Daelen & Justin Ciuche)

Singles 

 1984 – "Sleeper in Metropolis" (Rough Trade Germany)
 1984 – "Our Darkness" (miscellaneous, licensed from Red Flame)
 1984 – "Self Destruct" (Germany: Ten)
 1985 – "Sleeper in Metropolis" (Remix with David Harrow) (UK: Ink)
 1985 – "Wallies" (UK: Ink)
 1985 – "Heaven" (UK: Ten; Germany: Virgin Schallplatten)
 1986 – "True Love Tales" (UK: Ink)
 1987 – "Hope Road" (UK: Ten)
 1987 – "Homecoming" (UK: Ten, Germany: Virgin Schallplatten)
 1988 – "Our Darkness" / "Sleeper in Metropolis" / "Self Destruct" (UK: Ink)
 1990 – "Abuse" (Germany: SVP)
 1991 – "Counter Act" (SVP)
 1991 – "Counter Act" (Remixes) (SPV; single/EP)
 1992 – "If I Could" / "Our Darkness" (Remix) (SPV)
 1993 – "The Haunted Road: Travelogue Mixes" (SPV)
 1994 – "Elegy for a Lost Summer" (SPV)
 1994 – "Elegy for a Lost Summer" (Remix) (SPV)
 1996 – "Letter of Thanks to a Friend" (SPV; Bill Laswell remixes)
 1997 – "Our Darkness" ('97 Remixes) (Columbia Records/Sony BMG)
 1997 – "Sleeper in Metropolis" ('97 Remixes) (Gang Go, Columbia Records/Sony BMG)
 1998 – "Wallies (Night of the Hunter)" ('98 Remixes) (Columbia Records/Sony BMG)
 2002 – "The Hardest Heart" – Blank & Jones featuring Anne Clark (Gang Go/Warner)
 2003 – "Sleeper in Metropolis 3000" (Gang Go/Warner)
 2008 – "Full Moon" (netMusicZone)
 2014 – LifeWires (EP featuring herrB)

Compilations 
 1986 – An Ordinary Life (UK: Great Expectations/Ink; 15 tracks drawn from her first three albums LP/CD)
 1986 – Trilogy (UK: Ink; compilation of the first three albums, omits two tracks from Joined Up Writing; CD)
 1986 – Terra Incognita (Spain: Ink; LP)
 1991 – The Last Emotion (Beehive Productions; 3-CD box set: The Sitting Room/Changing Places/Joined Up Writing)
 1994 – The Best of Anne Clark (UK: Beehive Productions)
 1996 – Anne Clark: Nineties – a Fine Collection (Germany: Steamhammer, later: SPV; CD)
 2003 – Dream Made Real (Noble Price/TIM)
 2007 – Remix Collection (netMusicZone)
 2010 – Past & Future Tense Chapter One (After Hours Productions/Believe Digital)
 2011 – Die Künstlichen Paradiese  (Hörbuch Hamburg/Radio Bremen)

Videos 
 1992 – Iron Takes the Place of Air: Live in Berlin (SPV; Live Video, VHS)
 2008–2009 Anne Clark Live at Frankfurter Hof, Mainz (MMM Film GMBH)
 2018 – I'll Walk Out Into Tomorrow (Blu-ray, TAG/TRAUM Filmproduktion, in cooperation with Neue Visionen Filmproduktion)

Further reading 
 Anne Clark: Notes Taken, Traces Left. Fotografien – Texte – Interviews. Edited by  Jeff Aug, translated by Martin Müncheberg. Schwarzkopf & Schwarzkopf, 2003. . (328 pages, in English and German)

References

External links 

 
 

1960 births
Living people
English women singers
English new wave musicians
English songwriters
English women poets
Women new wave singers
People from Croydon
English women in electronic music
Virgin Records artists
Steamhammer Records artists